4055 Magellan, provisional designation , is a bright and eccentric asteroid and near-Earth object of the Amor group, approximately 2.5 kilometers in diameter. It was discovered on 24 February 1985, by American astronomer Eleanor Helin at Palomar Observatory in California, United States. It was later named for Portuguese explorer Ferdinand Magellan.

Orbit and classification 

Magellan orbits the Sun in the inner main-belt at a distance of 1.2–2.4 AU once every 2 years and 6 months (897 days). Its orbit has an eccentricity of 0.33 and an inclination of 23° with respect to the ecliptic.

The first observation was made at the Australian Siding Spring Observatory, extending the asteroid's observation arc by just one month prior to its official discovery observation at Palomar.

Physical characteristics 

Being a V-type asteroid in the Tholen and SMASS taxonomy, Magellan is thought to have originated from the Rheasilvia crater, a large impact crater on the south-polar surface of 4 Vesta, which is the main-belt's second-most-massive asteroid after 1 Ceres.

Diameter and albedo 

According to observations by the Keck Observatory and to the survey carried out by NASA's Wide-field Infrared Survey Explorer with its subsequent NEOWISE mission, Magellan measures between 2.2 and 2.8 kilometers in diameter and its surface has a high albedo of 0.31 to 0.33. The Collaborative Asteroid Lightcurve Link (LCDB) agrees with the Keck observations, adopting an albedo of 0.31 and a diameter of 2.49 kilometers.

Lightcurves 

Between 2000 and 2015, six rotational lightcurves of Magellan were obtained from photometric observations by astronomers Petr Pravec and Brian D. Warner, as well as by the Mexican Asteroid Photometry Campaign and the Palomar Transient Factory. The highest rated lightcurve by LCDB's standards was obtained by French amateur astronomer David Romeuf in July 2015, which gave a rotation period of  hours with a brightness variation of 0.45 magnitude. The large variation suggests an elongated shape.

Naming 

This minor planet was named after Portuguese navigator and explorer Ferdinand Magellan (Fernão de Magalhães; c. 1480–1521), who led and died on the first circumnavigation of the Earth during 1519–1522. The minor planet is also named after the modern Magellan spacecraft, which was launched by NASA in 1989 and went on to map the surface of Venus. The Portuguese navigator is also honored by the craters Magelhaens on Mars and Magelhaens on the Moon. The official naming citation was published by the Minor Planet Center on 2 December 1990.

See also
 HED meteorite
 3908 Nyx
 3551 Verenia

Notes

References

External links 
 David Romeuf's home page, 
 Asteroid Lightcurve Database (LCDB), query form (info )
 Dictionary of Minor Planet Names, Google books
 Asteroids and comets rotation curves, CdR – Observatoire de Genève, Raoul Behrend
 
 
 

004055
Discoveries by Eleanor F. Helin
Named minor planets
004055
19850224